Jean-Pascal Yao (born 13 January 1977 in Valence, Drome, France) is a French footballer who played on the professional level for French Ligue 2 clubs Valence during the 1995-1998 seasons and for Saint Etienne during the 2001-2003 seasons.

References

French footballers
French sportspeople of Ivorian descent
1977 births
Sportspeople from Valence, Drôme
Living people
Association football defenders
Footballers from Auvergne-Rhône-Alpes
AS Saint-Étienne players
ASOA Valence players
Nîmes Olympique players
Grenoble Foot 38 players